PHONE+ is a monthly trade publication for communication distribution channels providing news and strategic information to private-label resellers, agents, brokers, VARs, systems integrators, interconnects and dealers that deliver bundled voice, data, wireless, Internet and content services, and CPE. The magazine was established in 1987 and has a circulation of 20,000. The publication also is the sponsor of the Channel Partners Conference & Expo. It was published by Virgo Publishing's Telecom Division, based in Phoenix, Arizona, U.S.A. Virgo was acquired by Informa in 2014. Then the magazine was renamed as Channel Partners.

References

External links 
 Official website

Business magazines published in the United States
Monthly magazines published in the United States
Magazines established in 1987
Magazines published in Arizona
Professional and trade magazines
Mass media in Phoenix, Arizona
Informa brands